Mended with Gold is the third full-length album by Canadian indie rock band The Rural Alberta Advantage, released 30 October 2014 on Paper Bag Records in Canada and Saddle Creek Records in the United States.

Track listing

Personnel 
 Nils Edenloff - vocals, guitar
 Amy Cole - keyboard, bass, vocals
 Paul Banwatt - drums
 Leon Taheny - producer, mixing, recording
 Matt Lederman - producer, mixing, recording
 Joao Carvalho - mastering
 Bryan Lowe - assistant mastering
 Robyn Kotyk  - artwork
 Dara Kartz - management

References

2014 albums
The Rural Alberta Advantage albums
Saddle Creek Records albums
Paper Bag Records albums